Whithair v A-G [1996] 2 NZLR 45 is a cited case in New Zealand regarding the Bill of Rights Act.

References

Court of Appeal of New Zealand cases
New Zealand tort case law
1996 in New Zealand law
1996 in case law